Pokkuveyil ( Twilight) is a 1982 Indian Malayalam-language film, directed by G. Aravindan and produced by General Pictures' Raveendranathan Nair. The film stars Balachandran Chullikkad, Kalpana and S. Satish Kumar. Aravindan recorded its audio first as a composition for the flute by Pandit Hariprasad Chaurasia and the sarod by Rajeev Taranath. The visuals were 'composed' according to musical notations without any script.

Pokkuveyil won Aravindan the State Film award for best director.

The film stars Balachandran Chullikad, Kalpana, S. Satish Kumar, Kalabhavan Ansar and Chavara V. P. Nair. The film's score was composed by [Rajeev Taranath and Hariprasad Chaurasia]]. The indefinability of the human mind is the theme of the film.

Plot 
The protagonist of the film is a young artist (Balachandran Chullikkad) who lives with his father, a radical friend, a sportsman and a music-loving young woman. His world collapses when his father dies, the radical friend leaves him, the sportsman friend gets injured in an accident and has to give up sports and her family takes the woman away to another city. The final shot shows him curled up in foetal position in his cell in a mental asylum.

The movie won the Rajat Kamal for the second best movie in the country for the year 1982. It was screened in several international film festivals, including Cannes.

Pokkuveyil won Aravindan the State Film award for best director.

The background music of this movie was done by Hari Prasad Chaurasia with the flute.

Shaji N. Karun's outstanding work behind the camera was one of the main highlights of this movie.

Cast 
Balachandran Chullikkad
Kalpana
Kalabhavan Ansar
Chavara V. P. Nair
Vijayalakshmi
 Satish Kumar

Accolades 

 National Film Award for Second Best Feature Film 
 Kerala State Film Award for Best Direction - G. Aravindan
 Kerala State Film Award for Best Sound Recordist - P. Devadas

Soundtrack 
The music was composed by Balachandran Chullikkad with lyrics by Balachandran Chullikkad.

References

External links 
 

1982 films
1980s Malayalam-language films
Films scored by M. B. Sreenivasan
Films directed by G. Aravindan
Second Best Feature Film National Film Award winners